Frauental an der Laßnitz is a municipality in the district of Deutschlandsberg in the Austrian state of Styria. On its territory lies the eastern entrance of the Koralmtunnel, a 33 km long railway tunnel currently under construction.

Population

References

Cities and towns in Deutschlandsberg District